Know-how (or knowhow, or procedural knowledge) is a term for practical knowledge on how to accomplish something, as opposed to "know-what" (facts), "know-why" (science), or "know-who" (communication). It is also often referred to as street smarts (sometimes conceived as the opposite of book smarts), and a person employing their street smarts as street wise. Know-how is often tacit knowledge, which means that it can be difficult to transfer to another person by means of writing it down or verbalising it. The opposite of tacit knowledge is explicit knowledge.

Industrial know-how
In the context of industrial property (now generally viewed as intellectual property or IP), know-how is a component in the transfer of technology in national and international environments, co-existing with or separate from other IP rights such as patents, trademarks and copyright and is an economic asset. When it is transferred by itself, know-how should be converted into a trade secret before transfer in a legal agreement.

Know-how can be defined as confidentially held, or better, closely held information in the form of unpatented inventions, formulae, designs, drawings, procedures and methods, together with accumulated skills and experience in the hands of a licensor firm's professional personnel which could assist a transferee/licensee of the object product in its manufacture and use and bring to it a competitive advantage. It can be further supported with privately maintained expert knowledge on the operation, maintenance, use/application of the object product and of its sale, usage or disposition.

The inherent proprietary value of know-how is embedded in the legal protection afforded to trade secrets in general law, particularly, case law. Know-how, in short, is "private intellectual property" which can be said to be a form of precursor to other intellectual property rights. The "trade secret law" varies from country to country, unlike the case for patents, trademarks and copyright for which there are formal "conventions" through which subscribing countries grant the same protection to the "property" as the others; examples of which are the Paris Convention for the Protection of Industrial Property and the World Intellectual Property Organization (WIPO), under United Nations, a supportive organization designed "to encourage creative activity, [and] to promote the protection of intellectual property throughout the world".

The World Trade Organization defined a trade secret by the following criteria:

For purposes of illustration, the following may be a provision in a license agreement serving to define know-how:-

Show-how
Show-how is a diluted form of know-how since even a walk-through of a manufacturing plant provides valuable insights to the client's representatives into how a product is made, assembled, or processed. Show-how is also used to demonstrate technique. 

An enlarged program of show-how is the typical content of technical assistance agreements where the licensor firm, if one is involved, provides a substantial training program to the client's personnel on-site and off-site. Such training does not imply any grant of "license".

Disclosure agreements
There are two sets of agreements associated with the transfer of know-how agreement: (a) the disclosure and (b) the non-disclosure agreements, which are not separately parts of the principal know-how agreement.

The initial need for "disclosure" is due to the requirement of a licensee firm to know what is the specific, unique, or general "content" of the know-how that a licensor firm possesses that promises value to the licensee on entering into a contract. Disclosure also aids the potential licensee in selecting among competitive offers, if any. Such disclosures are made by licensors only under non-disclosure or confidentiality agreements in which there are express undertakings that should the ultimate license not materialize, the firm to whom the disclosure is made will not reveal, or by any manner apply, any part of the disclosed knowledge which is not in the public domain or previously known to the firm receiving the information.

Non-disclosure agreements are undertaken by those who receive confidential information from the licensee, relating to licensed know-how, so as to perform their tasks. Among them are the personnel of engineering firms who construct the plant for the licensee or those who are key employees of the licensee who have detailed access to disclosed data, etc. to administer their functions in operating the know-how-based plant. These are also in the nature of confidentiality agreements and carry the definition of know-how, in full or truncated part, on a need-to-know basis.

Employee knowledge 
Under English law, employees have a duty of good faith and fidelity until their employment ceases whereby only the former still applies.

It is sometimes unclear what forms "know how" that was divulged to an employee in order to carry out their functions and then becomes their own knowledge rather than a secret of their previous employer. Some employers will specify in their employment contracts that a "grace period" will apply to know how that starts when a person leaves them as an employee.

Specifying exactly what information this includes would increase the likelihood of it being upheld in court in the event of a breach, i.e. saying "when your employment contract is terminated, you must keep all information about your previous employment with us secret for four years" would be difficult to support because that person has to be able to use the skills and knowledge they learnt to gain employment elsewhere.

See also

References

Intellectual property law
Licensing
Knowledge
Procedural knowledge